Be Seeing You was the fifth album by Dr. Feelgood, and was released in October 1977. After the departure of Wilko Johnson, this was Dr. Feelgood's first album with guitarist Gypie Mayo.

The album reached number 55 in the UK Albums Chart in October 1977, and remained in that chart for only three weeks. It spawned their second single to enter the corresponding UK Singles Chart - "She's A Wind Up".

The album's title was a catchphrase, used by the band, taken from the cult TV series, The Prisoner, which was enjoying a revival at the time.  This theme continued on the album sleeve with the line "produced by Number 2 for Number 6", and included photos of the band in piped blazers and scarves, similar to those used in the series, and some "penny farthing" badges, although the album's front cover was photographed in the band's local pub, the Admiral Jellicoe.

Track listing 
 "Ninety-Nine and a Half (Won't Do)" (Steve Cropper, Eddie Floyd, Wilson Pickett) – 3:08
 "She's a Wind Up" (Lee Brilleaux, John Martin, John Mayo, John B. Sparks) – 2:01
 "I Thought I Had It Made" (Lee Brilleaux, John Mayo) – 2:16
 "I Don't Want to Know" (Lee Brilleaux, John Mayo) – 2:42
 "That's It, I Quit" (Nick Lowe) – 2:35
 "As Long as the Price Is Right" (Larry Wallis) – 3:09)
 "Hi-Rise" (John Mayo) – 2:37
 "My Buddy Buddy Friends" (Aaron Corthon) – 2:45
 "Baby Jane" (John Bishop, Harry Nesbitt, Bernard Reed, Lee Simmons, Jerry Wilson) – 2:58
 "The Blues Had a Baby, and They Named It Rock & Roll (#2)" (Brownie McGhee, McKinley Morganfield) – 2:20
 "Looking Back" (Johnny "Guitar" Watson) – 2:00
 "60 Minutes of Your Love" (Isaac Hayes, David Porter) – 2:25

Personnel 
Dr. Feelgood
 Lee Brilleaux - vocals, guitar, harmonica
 John B. Sparks - bass guitar, backing vocals
 Gypie Mayo - guitar
 The Big Figure (John Martin) - drums, backing vocals
Technical
 Paul Carrack - keyboards
 Nick Lowe - producer
 Paul Henry - cover design
 Keith Morris - photography

References

External links 
 Album lyrics @ Lyrics.doheth.co.uk
 

1977 albums
Albums produced by Nick Lowe
United Artists Records albums
Dr. Feelgood (band) albums